Oona Brown (born September 10, 2004) is an American ice dancer. Competing with her brother, Gage Brown, she is the 2022 World Junior champion and a two-time U.S. national junior medalist (2021 silver, 2020 bronze).

Personal life 
Oona Brown was born on September 10, 2004 in Greenport, New York. Her parents are Zhon Brown and Louis DeVirgilio. She has six siblings: Gage, who is her ice dance partner, Adira, Rowan, Tristan, Liam, and Morgant.

She and Gage are homeschooled.

Brown plays the drums and piano and plays the snare in two Irish marching bands. She also enjoys gardening, running, knitting, reading, and refereeing soccer.

Career

Early career 
Oona Brown started skating at age 4. She and her brother, Gage, were paired up as an ice dance team in 2016. At the intermediate level, they placed 4th at their first Eastern Sectionals, and 12th at the 2017 U.S. championships. They moved up to the novice level for the 2017–18 season, placing 1st their next sectional championships, and 5th 2018 U.S. championships. They made their international debut at the 2018 Bavarian Open, where they competed in the advanced novice competition and placed 3rd.

2018–19 season 
For the 2018–19 season, the Browns moved up to the junior level. They made their Junior Grand Prix debut at the 2018 JGP Lithuania, where they placed 9th. They placed 8th at the 2018 JGP Armenia, and won silver at the 2018 Eastern Sectionals. They advanced to the 2019 U.S. championships, where they placed 4th at the junior level and won the pewter medal.

2019–20 season 
The Browns began the 2019–20 season at the 2019 Lake Placid Ice Dance International, where they placed 4th. For the 2019-20 Junior Grand Prix they were assigned to the 2019 JGP Russia and 2019 JGP Italy, where they placed 8th and 5th respectively. They went on to place 4th at the 2020 Ice Dance Final, and qualified for the 2020 U.S. championships where they won the bronze medal. They were named to the 2020 World Junior Championships team, where they placed 11th in the rhythm dance and 9th in the free dance, finishing 10th overall.

2020–21 season 
Due to the COVID-19 pandemic, most of the major international events for juniors during 2020–21 were canceled; this included the 2020–21 Junior Grand Prix.

In December, the Browns debuted their new free dance to Australian singer Marlisa's cover of Metallica's Nothing Else Matters, filmed by On Ice Perspectives, a skating cinematography company created by former U.S. skater, Jordan Cowan. The free dance was performed at Bryant Park, and was uploaded to the On Ice Perspectives YouTube channel. It quickly gained popularity and surpassed one-million views within its first week.

In September, the USFSA held the virtual ISP (International Selection Pool) Points Challenge, which allowed skaters to be judged by ISU-level judges. The competition was used to give skaters byes to Nationals, which would usually be obtained through the Grand Prix series, and will also be used in the selection process for future international events. The Browns placed second overall in the junior event and qualified for the 2021 U.S. Championships.

2021–22 season 
With the resumption of international junior competition on the Junior Grand Prix, the Browns were assigned to compete at the second stage of the French JGP in Courchevel.  They placed second in the short program, narrowly behind the second American team present, Flores/Tsarevski, but won the free dance to take the gold medal, their first JGP medal. At their second event, the 2021 JGP Austria in Linz, the Browns were second in the rhythm dance. Oona Brown fell on her twizzle sequence in the free dance; as a result, they were fifth in that segment but narrowly took the silver medal overall. These results qualified them for the Junior Grand Prix Final, to be held in Osaka, but this was canceled as a result of restrictions prompted by the Omicron variant.

Oona tested positive for COVID-19 in early January, as a result of which they were forced to withdraw from the 2022 U.S. Junior Championships. Despite this setback, they were named to the American team for the 2022 World Junior Championships, with Gage vowing that "we're going to put absolutely everything into this" after the many missed competitions as a result of the pandemic.

The World Junior Championships were originally to be held Sofia, but were delayed from their traditional early March to mid-April in order to accommodate a move to Tallinn because of pandemic restrictions. Due to invasion of Ukraine, all Russian and Belarusian skaters were banned from attending. The Browns scored a new personal best in the rhythm dance, freedance, and total score. As Ted Barton said, "They did not look like leaders coming into the free[dance] and hoping to win; they had to earn it, so they didn't hold anything back. [They] just pushed all the way through it." Gage said "the last time we competed was in October. Just to get actually out here and compete was an amazing feeling. We missed that feeling for six months." They won the free dance as well to take the gold medal.

2022–23 season 
While the siblings had been debating for some time whether to remain at the junior level or move up to the senior ranks following their Junior World title, they decided to do the latter, with Gage calling it "the turning point for us, and it was great that it ended the way it did." They made their senior international debut on the Challenger circuit, finishing fifth at both the 2022 CS Nepela Memorial and the 2022 CS Budapest Trophy. The Browns were then invited to make their Grand Prix debut at the 2022 MK John Wilson Trophy, where they placed seventh. They were eighth at the 2022 Grand Prix of Espoo.

In their senior national championship debut, the Browns finished ninth at the 2023 U.S. Championships.

Programs

Competitive highlights 
CS: Challenger Series; GP: Grand Prix; JGP: Junior Grand Prix. Pewter medals (4th place) awarded only at U.S. national, sectional, and regional events.

Detailed results

Senior results

Junior results

Novice results

References

External links 
 Official Website
 
 Oona Brown and Gage Brown at U.S. Figure Skating

Living people
2004 births
American female ice dancers
People from Suffolk County, New York
21st-century American women
World Junior Figure Skating Championships medalists